Kantemirovsky (masculine), Kantemirovskaya (feminine), or Kantemirovskoye (neuter) may refer to:
Kantemirovsky District, a district of Voronezh Oblast, Russia
Kantemirovskaya (Moscow Metro), a station of the Moscow Metro, Moscow, Russia
4th Guards Kantemirovskaya Tank Division, an elite armored division of the Russian Ground Forces